Erus may refer to:
 Ərus, a village in Azerbaijan
 Erus (bishop of Lugo)

See also 
 Eru (disambiguation)